Michael Backes (born 7 January 1978) is a German professor of computer science. He is the founding director and CEO of the CISPA Helmholtz Center for Information Security. He is known for his work on formal methods, cryptography and privacy-enhancing technologies.

Life and career 
Born in Germany, he received a diploma degree in computer science and a diploma degree in mathematics from Saarland University in 2001 and 2002, respectively, and obtained his PhD in computer science from Saarland University in 2002 under the supervision of Birgit Pfitzmann and Harald Ganzinger.

He was successively a researcher at IBM Research (2002 – 2005) and associate professor (2005) and professor (2006 – today) of computer science at Saarland University, Germany.

He is the founding director and CEO of the newly funded CISPA Helmholtz Center for Information Security, Germany, since 2018.

His research is concerned with information security and privacy, particularly on security and privacy in machine learning, trustworthy information processing and medical privacy; design, analysis and verification for security-critical systems and services, and universal solutions in software and network security.

Awards and honors 
Backes has received a number of awards, including the following:
2004: Caspar Bowden Award 2004 
2005: IBM Outstanding Achievement Award 
2007: Fellow of the Max Planck Society
2008: IBM Faculty Award
2008: MIT TR35 
2009: European Research Council Starting Grant 
2014: European Research Council Synergy Grant 
2015: Member of the German Academy of Science and Engineering
2017: CNIL-INRIA Privacy Award 
2017: NSA Cybersecurity Research Award 
2018: Fellow of the IEEE
2018: Honorary Doctorate degree of the University of Lorraine

References

External links 
 Michael Backes Personal Page at CISPA
 List of publications by Michael Backes

1978 births
Saarland University alumni
German chief executives
Academic staff of Saarland University
Living people
Fellow Members of the IEEE